This is a list of the main career statistics of professional Spanish tennis player Pablo Carreño Busta.

Performance timelines 

Only main-draw results in ATP Tour, Grand Slam tournaments, Davis Cup/ATP Cup/Laver Cup and Olympic Games are included in win–loss records.

Singles 
Current through the 2022 Paris Masters.

Doubles

Significant finals

Grand Slam finals

Doubles: 1 (1 runner-up)

Olympic medal finals

Singles: 1 (1 Bronze Medal)

Masters 1000 finals

Singles: 1 (1 title)

Doubles: 2 (1 title, 1 runner-up)

ATP career finals

Singles: 12 (7 titles, 5 runners-up)

Doubles: 9 (4 titles, 5 runners-up)

National representation

ATP Challenger Tour and ITF Futures finals

Singles: 31 (23 titles, 8 runner–ups)

ATP Tour career earnings

* Statistics correct .

Grand Slam seedings

Record against other players

Record against top 10 players
Carreño Busta's record against those who have been ranked in the top 10, with active players in boldface.

Record against players ranked No. 11–20

Active players are in boldface. 

  Philipp Kohlschreiber 2–0
  Alex de Minaur 1–0
  Reilly Opelka 1–0
  Guido Pella 1–0
  Albert Ramos Viñolas 1–0
  Aslan Karatsev 1–1
  Benoît Paire 1–1

*

Wins over top 10 players 
Pablo is currently  against top 10 players who were in the top 10 at the moment of the match. He got his first win against a top 10 player after 17 attempts.

See also

 Spain Davis Cup team
ATP Finals appearances
Tennis in Spain
Sport in Spain

Notes

References 

Carreño Busta, Pablo